The Stephen Hall House is a historic house at 64 Minot Street in Reading, Massachusetts.  The -story wood-frame house was built in the 1850s, and is one of Reading's best examples of Gothic Victorian residential architecture.  It has board-and-batten siding, long and narrow windows, and a central projecting gabled overhang with Gothic arched windows and a deep eave with brackets.  Although it appears to be a near copy of a design published by Andrew Jackson Downing, its plan was apparently copied from a house in Wakefield, and is lacking some of Downing's proportions.

The house was listed on the National Register of Historic Places in 1984.

See also
National Register of Historic Places listings in Reading, Massachusetts
National Register of Historic Places listings in Middlesex County, Massachusetts

References

Houses on the National Register of Historic Places in Reading, Massachusetts
Houses in Reading, Massachusetts
Houses completed in 1855
1855 establishments in Massachusetts